Wild Things with Dominic Monaghan is a wildlife documentary series commissioned by Channel 5 and BBC America and presented by actor Dominic Monaghan, who also serves as an executive producer for the show. Each hour-long episode follows Monaghan, an avid outdoorsman, as he travels to a new exotic location in search of "some of the most dangerous and elusive creatures known to man." The show's eight-episode first series premiered in the UK on 9 November 2012 and in the U.S. on 22 January 2013, and was nominated for Best Reality Series at the 3rd Annual Critics' Choice Television Awards. In June 2013, Wild Things with Dominic Monaghan was renewed for a second series, which premiered in the U.S. on 25 March 2014 on BBC America. After Channel 5 elected not to acquire the second season, BBC Worldwide acquired the international rights to the show. In the U.S., the third season aired on the Travel Channel instead of BBC America. It originally aired in prime time on Wednesdays, but later moved to Saturday mornings.

The show was nominated for the Outstanding Unstructured Reality Program at the 66th Primetime Creative Arts Emmy Awards.

Episode list

Series 1 (2013)

Series 2 (2014)

Series 3 (2016)

References

External links
 Wild Things with Dominic Monaghan - Official Site (Travel Channel)
 
 

Nature educational television series